Judge Dawkins may refer to:

Benjamin C. Dawkins Jr. (1911–1984), judge of the United States District Court for the Western District of Louisiana
Benjamin C. Dawkins Sr. (1881–1966), judge of the United States District Court for the Western District of Louisiana
James Baird Dawkins (1820–1883) state court judge in Florida

See also
Judge Thomas Dawkins House, residence of Judge Thomas Dawkins, a well-known political leader in Union County, South Carolina during and after the American Civil War